Châu Thành A is a rural district (huyện) of Hậu Giang province in the Mekong Delta region of Vietnam. In the wake of Government Decree 64/2000/ND-CP on November 6, 2000, Châu Thành A district, formerly of Cần Thơ, was reestablished by removing 22.139 km2 of land and 163,357 people from Châu Thành. At the time, Châu Thành A had eight administrative units, being Tân Thuận, Thạnh Xuân, Tân Hoà, Trường Long, Nhơn Ái, Nhơn Nghĩa, Trường Long Tây and Tân Phú Thạnh.

By Government Decree No. 05/2004/ND-CP dated January 2, 2004, Châu Thành A district acquired 5.31 km2 and 6,339 people from neighbouring Tân Phú Thạnh district to form the newly created Cái Răng, Nhơn Ái, Nhơn Nghĩa and Trường Long communes.

Divisions
The district is divided into 8 communes:

Tân Thuận, Thạnh Xuân, Tân Hoà, Trường Long, Nhơn Ái, Nhơn Nghĩa, Trường Long Tây and Tân Phú Thạnh.

Districts of Hậu Giang province